9549 Akplatonov, provisional designation , is an Eunomia asteroid from the central region of the asteroid belt, approximately  in diameter. It was discovered on 19 September 1985, by Soviet–Russian astronomer couple Nikolai and Lyudmila Chernykh at the Crimean Astrophysical Observatory in Nauchnyj, on the Crimean peninsula. The likely S-type asteroid has a relatively short rotation period of 2.8 hours. It was named for Russian computational mathematician .

Orbit and classification 

Akplatonov is a core member of the Eunomia family, a large group of stony S-type asteroids and the most prominent family in the intermediate main-belt. Alternatively, in Nesvorný's HCM-analysis, the asteroid belong's to the main belt's background population, while in an earlier such analysis, Thais Mothé-Diniz considered Akplatonov to be the largest body in a small cluster or clump of its own. It orbits the Sun in the central asteroid belt at a distance of 2.3–2.9 AU once every 4 years and 3 months (1,537 days; semi-major axis of 2.61 AU). Its orbit has an eccentricity of 0.11 and an inclination of 11° with respect to the ecliptic.

Naming 

He pioneered the research in walking robots, the computation of satellite orbits around Earth, and the guidance of the flight path of spacecraft in the Solar System. The official  was published by the Minor Planet Center on 24 June 2002.

Physical characteristics

Rotation period 

A rotational lightcurve of Akplatonov was obtained from photometric observations using the 0.9-meter SARA telescope at Kitt Peak National Observatory in May 2009. It showed a rotation period of  hours with a brightness variation of 0.15 magnitude. A poorly rated period determination from a fragmentary lightcurve by astronomers at the Palomar Transient Factory in 2010 gave a period of 4.7 hours.

Diameter and albedo 

According to the survey carried out by the NEOWISE mission of NASA's space-based Wide-field Infrared Survey Explorer, Akplatonov measures 8.2 kilometers in diameter and its surface has an albedo of 0.285, while the Collaborative Asteroid Lightcurve Link (CALL) assumes an albedo of 0.21 – derived from 15 Eunomia, the family's largest member and namesake – and calculates a diameter of 9.17 kilometers using an absolute magnitude of 12.5.

References

External links 
 Asteroid Lightcurve Database (LCDB), query form (info )
 Dictionary of Minor Planet Names, Google books
 Discovery Circumstances: Numbered Minor Planets (5001)-(10000) – Minor Planet Center
 
 

009549
009549
Discoveries by Nikolai Chernykh
Discoveries by Lyudmila Chernykh
Named minor planets
19850919